Medvedkovo is the name of several  rural localities in Russia.

Ivanovo Oblast
As of 2010, three rural localities in Ivanovo Oblast bear this name:
Medvedkovo, Furmanovsky District, Ivanovo Oblast, a selo in Furmanovsky District
Medvedkovo, Lezhnevsky District, Ivanovo Oblast, a village in Lezhnevsky District
Medvedkovo, Puchezhsky District, Ivanovo Oblast, a village in Puchezhsky District

Kirov Oblast
As of 2010, one rural locality in Kirov Oblast bears this name:
Medvedkovo, Kirov Oblast, a village in Novotroitsky Rural Okrug of Shabalinsky District

Moscow Oblast
As of 2010, three rural localities in Moscow Oblast bear this name:
Medvedkovo, Dmitrovsky District, Moscow Oblast, a village in Gabovskoye Rural Settlement of Dmitrovsky District
Medvedkovo, Klinsky District, Moscow Oblast, a village under the administrative jurisdiction of the Town of Klin in Klinsky District
Medvedkovo, Volokolamsky District, Moscow Oblast, a village in Chismenskoye Rural Settlement of Volokolamsky District

Nizhny Novgorod Oblast
As of 2010, three rural localities in Nizhny Novgorod Oblast bear this name:
Medvedkovo, Bor, Nizhny Novgorod Oblast, a village in Sitnikovsky Selsoviet of the town of oblast significance of Bor
Medvedkovo, Bolshemurashkinsky District, Nizhny Novgorod Oblast, a village in Grigorovsky Selsoviet of Bolshemurashkinsky District
Medvedkovo, Perevozsky District, Nizhny Novgorod Oblast, a village in Tanaykovsky Selsoviet of Perevozsky District

Novgorod Oblast
As of 2010, one rural locality in Novgorod Oblast bears this name:
Medvedkovo, Novgorod Oblast, a village in Fedorkovskoye Settlement of Parfinsky District

Pskov Oblast
As of 2010, five rural localities in Pskov Oblast bear this name:
Medvedkovo, Nevelsky District, Pskov Oblast, a village in Nevelsky District
Medvedkovo, Palkinsky District, Pskov Oblast, a village in Palkinsky District
Medvedkovo, Pechorsky District, Pskov Oblast, a village in Pechorsky District
Medvedkovo (Uspenskaya Rural Settlement), Velikoluksky District, Pskov Oblast, a village in Velikoluksky District; municipally, a part of Uspenskaya Rural Settlement of that district
Medvedkovo (Maryinskaya Rural Settlement), Velikoluksky District, Pskov Oblast, a village in Velikoluksky District; municipally, a part of Maryinskaya Rural Settlement of that district

Smolensk Oblast
As of 2010, one rural locality in Smolensk Oblast bears this name:
Medvedkovo, Smolensk Oblast, a village in Steshinskoye Rural Settlement of Kholm-Zhirkovsky District

Republic of Tatarstan
As of 2010, one rural locality in the Republic of Tatarstan bears this name:
Medvedkovo, Republic of Tatarstan, a village in Verkhneuslonsky District

Tver Oblast
As of 2010, eight rural localities in Tver Oblast bear this name:
Medvedkovo, Kashinsky District, Tver Oblast, a village in Pisyakovskoye Rural Settlement of Kashinsky District
Medvedkovo, Kimrsky District, Tver Oblast, a village in Ustinovskoye Rural Settlement of Kimrsky District
Medvedkovo, Kuvshinovsky District, Tver Oblast, a village in Borkovskoye Rural Settlement of Kuvshinovsky District
Medvedkovo, Lesnoy District, Tver Oblast, a settlement in Medvedkovskoye Rural Settlement of Lesnoy District
Medvedkovo, Maksatikhinsky District, Tver Oblast, a village in Truzhenitskoye Rural Settlement of Maksatikhinsky District
Medvedkovo, Spirovsky District, Tver Oblast, a village in Kozlovskoye Rural Settlement of Spirovsky District
Medvedkovo, Torzhoksky District, Tver Oblast, a village in Boristsevskoye Rural Settlement of Torzhoksky District
Medvedkovo, Vesyegonsky District, Tver Oblast, a village in Chamerovskoye Rural Settlement of Vesyegonsky District

Vologda Oblast
As of 2010, one rural locality in Vologda Oblast bears this name:
Medvedkovo, Vologda Oblast, a village in Biryakovsky Selsoviet of Sokolsky District

Yaroslavl Oblast
As of 2010, four rural localities in Yaroslavl Oblast bear this name:
Medvedkovo, Bolsheselsky District, Yaroslavl Oblast, a village in Novoselsky Rural Okrug of Bolsheselsky District
Medvedkovo, Breytovsky District, Yaroslavl Oblast, a village in Breytovsky Rural Okrug of Breytovsky District
Medvedkovo, Pervomaysky District, Yaroslavl Oblast, a village in Uritsky Rural Okrug of Pervomaysky District
Medvedkovo, Yaroslavsky District, Yaroslavl Oblast, a village in Ivnyakovsky Rural Okrug of Yaroslavsky District

References